David Graham Miller   is an Australian collaborative pianist. Along with Geoffrey Collins he was nominated for the 1990 ARIA Award for Best Classical Album for their album Flute Australia Volume 2 (2MBS-FM). He performed on the first full recording of Boojum by Peter and Martin Wesley-Smith with Sydney Philharmonia motet choir. With baritone Michael Halliwell, Miller released Soldier, Soldier: The Barrack-Room Ballads Of Rudyard Kipling (ArtWorks, 2001). In 2013, Miller recorded Echo: the songs of Horace Keats for ABC Classics with soprano Wendy Dixon, baritone John Pringle and violinist Marina Marsden, performing the songs of the Australian composer Horace Keats.

David G. Miller was appointed Member of the Order of Australia in 1995 for "service to music, particularly as a piano accompanist".

Disocography

Albums

Awards and nominations

ARIA Music Awards
The ARIA Music Awards is an annual awards ceremony that recognises excellence, innovation, and achievement across all genres of Australian music. They commenced in 1987. 

! 
|-
| 1990
| Flute Australia Volume 2 (with Geoffrey Collins)
| Best Classical Album
| 
| 
|-

References

External links
Australian works commissioned and written for David Miller; recordings, world premieres and events featuring David Miller on the Australian Music Centre site.
Biographical cuttings on David Miller, pianist, containing one or more cuttings from newspapers or journals at the National Library of Australia
Artists on Art - Conversations On Creativity: Article by Bruce Daniel, 13 July 2020
David G. Miller, Collaborative Pianist - http://davidgmiller.com.au

Living people
Australian musicians
Australian accompanists
Members of the Order of Australia
1943 births